Samuel Archibald may refer to:

 Samuel Archibald (politician, born 1742) (1742–1780), Irish-born farmer, merchant and political figure in Nova Scotia
 Samuel George William Archibald (1776–1846), his son, lawyer, judge and political figure in Nova Scotia
 Samuel Archibald (writer) (born 1978), Canadian writer